Norman Wong is an American writer and activist. He is best known for his 1995 short story collection Cultural Revolution, which was one of the first book-length works of LGBT literature ever published by an Asian American writer.

Biography
Born and raised in Honolulu, he is a graduate of the University of Chicago and Johns Hopkins University. He is currently enrolled at the William S. Richardson School of Law at the University of Hawaiʻi at Mānoa.

His stories have appeared in Men's Style, Kenyon Review, the Asian Pacific American Journal and the Threepenny Review. He taught fiction writing at the Writer's Voice and Johns Hopkins.

He is openly gay.

Bibliography
Cultural Revolution 
Men on Men 4, anthology
Men on Men 6, anthology
Boys Like Us, anthology

References

External links
Random House Author's page

Year of birth missing (living people)
Living people
American short story writers
Writers from Honolulu
University of Chicago alumni
American LGBT people of Asian descent
American gay writers
American male short story writers
William S. Richardson School of Law alumni]